Samuel Youngs (November 5, 1753 - November 2, 1797) was an American farmer and politician from New York

Life
He was the son of Daniel Youngs (1718–1784) and Hannah (Underhill) Youngs. He married Rebecca Brush, and they had nine children.

He was a member of the New York State Assembly (Queens Co.) in 1794.

His grandson Samuel Youngs was a member of the State Assembly in 1843 and 1844.

Sources
The History of Long Island by Benjamin F. Thompson (New York, 1843; Vol. II, page 384)

1753 births
1797 deaths
People from Queens, New York
Members of the New York State Assembly
18th-century American politicians